The International Organisation of Vine and Wine (OIV) is an intergovernmental organization which deals with technical and scientific aspects of viticulture and winemaking. The field of OIV includes grape production for all purposes, i.e. not just wine, but also table grapes and raisin production.

One of the activities of OIV is the compilation of global statistics within its field.

OIV is based in Dijon, and had 49 member states as of 2022.

History 
The earliest forerunners of the OIV are the international conferences held as a reaction to the 19th century phylloxera epidemic, with the five-nation Montpellier Congress held between 26-30 October 1874 being the foremost among these. The idea of an international organization came up several times during the coming decades, and finally, on 29 November 1924, eight nations signed an agreement concerned with the creation of an International Wine Office (Office international du vin, OIV) in Paris. After that the agreement went back to nations for ratification. The first working session was held at Salon de l’Horloge on 3 December 1927. On 4 September 1958, the organization's name was changed to the International Vine and Wine Office (Office International de la Vigne et du Vin).

The current International Organisation of Vine and Wine was established following a 35-nation agreement on 3 April 2001, and replaced the International Vine and Wine Office. This agreement went into effect on 1 January 2004.

Member states

Scientific wine color determination 
The International Organisation of Vine and Wine provides methods to assess the color of a wine using a spectrophotometer and the calculation of indices in the Lab color space.

Resolutions 
In 2013, the OIV took a resolution which "recommends obtaining and developing new cultivars which carry multiple resistance loci [...] to lower the risk of selection and of development of more aggressive pathogen strains", especially for downy and powdery mildew.

References

External links
 OIV's web site

Wine industry organizations
Organizations established in 2004
Intergovernmental organizations established by treaty
Vine and Wine
Organizations based in Paris
2004 establishments in France